is a slice-of-life romantic comedy manga series written and drawn by . Shogakukan serialized it through its webcomic platform  from July 15, 2016, to January 31, 2020, and released it across three collected tankōbon volumes between 2017 and 2020.

The story follows a married couple, Yuki and Kou, through short chapters depicting their everyday life. Although they are both men, they consider themselves wife and husband, and Yuki dresses like a woman. The series was well received by critics, who liked the portrayal of Yuki and Kou's romantic relationship, and found Yuki a cute and appealing character.

Premise
Otokonoko Zuma is a romantic comedy manga following a loving married couple: the soft-spoken and feminine Yuki, and the honest and quirky Kou. Although the two appear to be a heterosexual couple and consider themselves wife and husband, Yuki is a cross-dressing man. Each chapter follows a slice-of-life scenario such as Yuki and Kou meeting acquaintances or going to the cinema, but also situations arising from how Yuki is cross-dressing and how others react to him, such as when he goes to the men's public bath or uses the men's bathroom. Yuki thinks cross-dressing is embarrassing at times, but still enjoys doing it and loves making Kou happy by being cute.

Production and release
It was serialized by Shogakukan on a monthly basis through their webcomic platform  from July 15, 2016, to January 31, 2020, and was collected in three tankōbon volumes from 2017 to 2020 under Shogakukan's Shounen Sunday Comics imprint. The release schedule for the volumes was slower than usual for manga due to how only eight new pages were published each month, meaning it took more than a year to accumulate enough new chapters to fill a whole tankōbon volume.

Volumes

Reception
Otokonoko Zuma was critically well received, but despite this, the collected volumes only saw a very limited print run; Crystal na Yousuke described it as "unlikely" that readers would find copies in book stores and recommended reading the e-book versions.

NLab liked the series, describing it as standing out from other manga about gay romance or cross-dressing. Although the series does not discuss LGBT issues much, they did not think it felt missing, and liked seeing Yuki and Kou being happy together and their families accepting them, describing it as a good portrayal of a loving marriage. They praised the scene where Kou proposes to Yuki, with Kou treating Yuki's gender as completely irrelevant to whether he would want to marry him. Nico Nico News agreed, describing Yuki and Kou's relationship as heartwarming. NLab, Natalie, and Nico Nico News all found Yuki cute; Nico Nico News described him as attractive and full of what makes otokonoko characters charming, with the contrast between his gender and his appearance. NLab appreciated how characters respect Yuki's gender and treat him as a man regardless of his femininity and how he is the wife.

See also
Onidere, another manga by the same author
Love Is Like a Cocktail, another web manga by the same author

References

External links
  

2016 webcomic debuts
2020 webcomic endings
Cross-dressing in anime and manga
Japanese comedy webcomics
LGBT in anime and manga
LGBT-related webcomics
Romance webcomics
Romantic comedy anime and manga
Shogakukan manga
Shōnen manga
Slice of life anime and manga
Webcomics in print